Łupawa is a river of Poland.  It terminates in the Baltic Sea near Rowy.

1Łupawa
Rivers of Poland
Rivers of Pomeranian Voivodeship